The Solomons white-eye or New Georgia white-eye (Zosterops kulambangrae) is a species of bird in the family Zosteropidae. It is endemic to the New Georgia Islands in the Solomon Islands. It is also known as Zosterops rendovae but this name properly refers to the grey-throated white-eye.

The species is widespread in the New Georgia Group, occurring on Kolombangara, Vonavona, Kohinggo, New Georgia, Vangunu and Nggatokae. It regularly visits small islets.

It is 12 cm long and mainly green above and olive-yellow below. It has a narrow white ring around the eye, blackish forehead and lores, a black bill and yellowish legs.

References

Solomons white-eye
Birds of the Western Province (Solomon Islands)
Solomons white-eye
Solomons white-eye
Solomons white-eye
Taxonomy articles created by Polbot